Craterium is a genus of slime molds belonging to the family Physaraceae. The genus has a cosmopolitan distribution.

The genus was first described in 1797 by Johann Friedrich Trentepohl in Catalecta botanica quibus plantae novae et minus cognitae describuntur atque illustrantur.

Species
The following species are recognised in the genus Craterium:
 

Craterium atrolucens 
Craterium aureomagnum 
Craterium aureonucleatum 
Craterium aureum 
Craterium aureum 
Craterium concinnum 
Craterium corniculatum 
Craterium costatum 
Craterium dictyosporum 
Craterium leucocephalum 
Craterium leucocephalum 
Craterium microcarpum 
Craterium minutum 
Craterium muscorum 
Craterium obovatum 
Craterium paraguayense 
Craterium reticulatum 
Craterium retisporum 
Craterium rubronodum 
Craterium subpurpurea 
Craterium yichunense

References

Amoebozoa genera
Physaraceae